Overgaard-Nielsen is a surname. Notable people with the surname include: 
Christian Overgaard Nielsen (1918-1999), Danish zoologist and ecologist
Henrik Overgaard-Nielsen, Danish dentist and politician

See also
Nielsen (surname)

Compound surnames
Danish-language surnames